This article is the discography of Greek singer Vicky Leandros.

Albums 
Many variations of Leandros's albums were released around the world and a huge number of compilations which still continue to be released on a regular basis. The following list is of original studio albums she recorded. In Japan a few albums also contain some songs mainly in Japanese or English which were not released elsewhere though the majority of tracks were recorded in Europe and featured in various languages on albums already listed here. Despite well over a hundred compilation albums having been released, only a handful have been included below.

Studio albums

Compilation albums

Video albums

Singles

1960s

1970s

1980s

1990s–present

Notes

References 

Discographies of Greek artists
Pop music discographies